Aging Cell is a peer-reviewed open access scientific journal and an official journal of the Anatomical Society. It is published on their behalf by John Wiley & Sons. It was established in 2002 and the editors-in-chief are Peter Adams (Sanford Burnham Prebys Medical Discovery Institute) and Adam Antebi (Max Planck Institute for Biology of Ageing). The journal covers research on all aspects of aging, publishing research articles, reviews, minireviews, and commentaries.

Abstracting and indexing
The journal is abstracted and indexed in:

According to the Journal Citation Reports, the journal has a 2021 impact factor of 11.005.

References

External links

Gerontology journals
Molecular and cellular biology journals
Wiley (publisher) academic journals
Bimonthly journals
Publications established in 2002
English-language journals